Bal-Can-Can (transliterated Bal-Kan-Kan) is a 2005 Macedonian-Italian joint production film about a deserter who travels throughout the Balkans as a political immigrant in search of his dead mother-in-law who is wrapped in a carpet.

Cast

Release

Reception
The film was mostly praised by critics with some reviewers, such as Dennis Harvey of Variety, commenting on the film; "Writer-helmer Darko Mitrevski keeps pushing the envelope... The cynical, hallucinatory, modern Pilgrim's Progress is a trip, with memorably out-there sequences sure to build a cult rep among adventuresome cineastes."

Box office
The film was the highest-grossing film to date in the Republic of Macedonia. It was also released in Russia, United Kingdom, Spain, Turkey, Greece, Ukraine, Serbia, Croatia, Bulgaria, Slovenia, Bosnia and Herzegovina.

Awards and nominations

See also
 List of Macedonian films

References

External links 
 
Variety

2005 films
Italian drama films
Macedonian drama films
English-language Italian films
English-language Macedonian films
Films about deserters